Saint-Siméon is a parish municipality in Quebec, Canada. It is also sometimes called Saint-Siméon-de-Bonaventure to avoid confusion with Saint-Siméon in the Capitale-Nationale region.

Demographics 

See also
 List of parish municipalities in Quebec

References

Parish municipalities in Quebec
Incorporated places in Gaspésie–Îles-de-la-Madeleine